The 79th Fighter Squadron is part of the 20th Fighter Wing at Shaw Air Force Base, South Carolina.  It operates the General Dynamics F-16 Fighting Falcon aircraft conducting air superiority missions.

The squadron is one of the oldest in the United States Air Force, its origins dating to 22 February 1918, being organized at Rich Field, Waco, Texas, as a pilot training Squadron during World War I.   The squadron saw combat during World War II, and became part of the United States Air Forces in Europe (USAFE) during the Cold War.

History

The 79th Fighter Squadron traces its history back to February 1918, when it was first organized as the 79th Aero Squadron.

The unit was inactive from November 1918 until April 1933, when it became the 79th Pursuit Squadron, flying the Boeing P-12 at Barksdale Field, Louisiana. From 1940 to 1942, the squadron trained combat pilots and flew the Curtiss P-40 Warhawk from bases on the East Coast.

Second World War 

In 1943, the 79th converted to the Lockheed P-38 Lightning, flying out of Northamptonshire, England, performing duties as bomber escorts and conducting fighter sweeps over Germany. The 79th remained at English bases throughout the war, supporting both the Normandy invasion and the allied drive into Germany.  The squadron returned to the States and was inactivated on 19 October 1945.

Post-war reactivation
The 79th was again brought to active service on 29 July 1946, at Biggs Field, Texas.  The unit moved to Shaw Field, South Carolina, in October 1946.  The squadron moved again to Langley Air Force Base, Virginia, in November 1951.

With NATO in Europe
In June 1952, the squadron began to train to support NATO's Allied Forces Central Europe ground forces in conventional and nuclear roles arriving at RAF Woodbridge, England, 1 October 1952, flying first the F-84G Thunderjet and then in 1955 the swept wing F-84F Thunderstreak.  Redesignated as the 79th Tactical Fighter Squadron, the unit transitioned onto the North American F-100 Super Sabre in 1957 and shared RAF Woodbridge with the 78th Tactical Fighter Squadron of the 81st Tactical Fighter Wing and operated locally under the command of the 81st Wing which was based at nearby RAF Bentwaters. The next change came in 1970, when the squadron transitioned to the General Dynamics F-111 Aardvark and moved to RAF Upper Heyford, England.  The 79th received the Commander in Chief's Trophy in 1981, as the best tactical fighter squadron in U.S. Air Forces in Europe.

Desert Storm
From 1990 to 1991, the 79th deployed to Southwest Asia to support Operations Desert Shield and Desert Storm.  On 30 June 1993 the squadron was  yet again inactivated.

Return to the United States

On 1 January 1994, the 79th was reactivated at Shaw Air Force Base, South Carolina, transitioning to the General Dynamics F-16 Fighting Falcon and assuming the mission of suppression of enemy air defenses.  Since that time, the 79th has continuously supported Operations Northern and Southern Watch in Southwest Asia.

In December 1998, the 79th took an active part in Operation Desert Fox in conjunction with Operation Southern Watch demands.  The squadron flew more than 1,000 successful combat sorties with these dual operational requirements.  In January 1999, the 79th Fighter Squadron was awarded the South Carolina Air Force Association's Outstanding Air Force Unit of the Year award.  Also, in 1999, the squadron was honored with the Air Combat Command's Maintenance Effectiveness Award.  In June 1999, the 79th deployed F-16CJs in support of Operation Allied Force to a bare base in Southwest Asia.

2013 Sequestration
Air Combat Command officials announced a stand down and reallocation of flying hours for the rest of the fiscal year 2013 due to mandatory budget cuts.   The across-the board spending cuts, called sequestration, took effect 1 March when Congress failed to agree on a deficit-reduction plan.

Squadrons either stood down on a rotating basis or kept combat ready or at a reduced readiness level called "basic mission capable" for part or all of the remaining months in fiscal 2013. This affected the 79th Fighter Squadron, with a reduction of its flying hours, placing it into a basic mission capable status from 5 April – 30 July, then returning it to combat mission ready through September 2013.

Lineage
 Squadron B, Taliaferro Field, Texas
 Organized as 79th Aero Squadron on 22 February 1918
 Redesignated Squadron B, Taliaferro Field, Texas on 23 July 1918
 Demobilized on 15 November 1918

 79th Fighter Squadron
 Constituted as the 79th Observation Squadron on 18 October 1927
 Redesignated 79th Pursuit Squadron on 8 May 1929
 Organized as a Regular Army Inactive unit with reserve personnel on 7 September 1932
 Activated on 1 April 1933
 Consolidated with Squadron B, Taliaferro Field on 25 May 1933
 Redesignated 79th Pursuit Squadron (Fighter) on 6 December 1939
 Redesignated 79th Pursuit Squadron (Interceptor) on 12 March 1941
 Redesignated 79th Fighter Squadron on 15 May 1942
 Redesignated 79th Fighter Squadron (Twin Engine) on 30 December 1942
 Redesignated 79th Fighter Squadron, Two Engine on 20 August 1943
 Redesignated 79th Fighter Squadron, Single Engine on 5 September 1944
 Inactivated on 18 October 1945
 Activated on 29 July 1946
 Redesignated 79th Fighter Squadron, Jet on 15 June 1948
 Redesignated 79th Fighter-Bomber Squadron on 20 January 1950
 Redesignated 79th Tactical Fighter Squadron on 8 July 1958
 Redesignated 79th Fighter Squadron on 1 October 1991
 Inactivated on 30 June 1993
 Activated on 1 January 1994.

Assignments
 Unknown, 22 February–15 November 1918
 Eighth Corps Area, 18 October 1927 (in inactive status)
 20th Pursuit Group (later 20th Fighter Group), 1 April 1933 – 18 October 1945
 20th Fighter Group (later 20th Fighter-Bomber Group), 29 July 1946 (attached to 20th Fighter-Bomber Wing after 15 November 1952)
 20th Fighter-Bomber Wing (later 20th Tactical Fighter Wing), 8 February 1955 (attached to 39th Tactical Group, 1–31 August 1990 and February 1991
 20th Operations Group, 31 March 1992 – 30 September 1993
 20th Operations Group, 1 January 1994 – present

Stations

 Waco, Texas, 20 February 1918
 Taliaferro Field, Texas, 28 February–15 November 1918
 San Antonio, Texas, 7 September 1932
 Barksdale Field, Louisiana, 1 April 1933
 Moffett Field, California. 19 November 1939
 Hamilton Field, California, 9 September 1940 (operated From: Oakland Airport, California 8 December 1941 – 8 February 1942)
 Bluethenthal Field, North Carolina, c. 21 February 1942
 Morris Field, North Carolina, 23 April 1942
 Drew Field, Florida, August 1942
 Paine Field, Washington, 30 September 1942
 March Field, California, c. 1 January–11 August 1943

 RAF Kings Cliffe (AAF-367), England, c. 27 August 1943 – 11 October 1945
 Camp Kilmer, New Jersey, 16–18 October 1945
 Biggs Field, Texas, 29 July 1946
 Shaw Field (later, Shaw Air Force Base), South Carolina, c. 25 October 1946
 Langley Air Force Base, Virginia, 19 November 1951 – 22 May 1952
 RAF Wethersfield, England, 1 June 1952
 RAF Woodbridge, England, 1 October 1952
 RAF Upper Heyford, England, c. 1 May 1970 – 30 September 1993 (deployed at Incirlik Air Base, Turkey, 1–31 August 1990 and February 1991
 Shaw Air Force Base, South Carolina, 1 January 1994 – present

Aircraft

 Curtiss JN-4, 1918
 Curtiss JN-6, 1918
 Thomas-Morse S-4, 1918
 Boeing P-12, 1930–1935
 Boeing P-26 Peashooter, 1934–1938
 Curtiss P-36 Hawk, 1938–1940
 Curtiss P-40 Warhawk, 1940–1942
 Bell P-39 Airacobra, 1942–1943
 Lockheed P-38 Lightning, 1943–1944
 North American P-51 Mustang, 1944–1945, 1946–1948
 Republic F-84 Thunderjet, 1948–1957
 North American F-100 Super Sabre, 1957–1970
 General Dynamics F-111 Aardvark, 1970–1993
 General Dynamics F-16 Fighting Falcon, 1994–present

See also

 List of American Aero Squadrons

References

Notes
 Explanatory notes

 Citations

Bibliography

 
 
  (subscription required for web access)
 
 
 
 

079
Military units and formations in South Carolina
079